The Roman Mysteries is a series of historical novels for children by Caroline Lawrence. The first book, The Thieves of Ostia, was published in 2001, finishing with The Man from Pomegranate Street, published in 2009, and totaling 17 novels, plus a number of "mini-mysteries", spinoffs, and companion titles.

The books take place during the ancient Roman Empire during the reign of the Emperor Titus. They detail the adventures of four children who solve mysteries and have adventures in Ostia Antica, Rome, Greece, and beyond: Flavia, a rich Roman girl who lives in Ostia; Nubia, a freed slave girl from Africa; Jonathan, a rich Jewish boy; and Lupus, an orphaned mute beggar boy.

Characters

The four detectives
 Flavia Gemina: A wealthy Roman girl, daughter of a sea captain Marcus Flavius Geminus
 Jonathan ben Mordecai: A kind but pessimistic Jewish/Christian boy
 Nubia: An African girl, former slave of Flavia, good with animals
 Lupus: A mute beggar boy with a tragic past

Other characters
 Marcus Flavius Geminus: Flavia's father, a sea captain
 Mordecai: Jonathan's father, a doctor
 Miriam bat Mordecai: Jonathan's older sister
 Aristo: Greek tutor of the children

Characters based on historical persons
 Pliny the Elder, admiral of the Misenum fleet and an accomplished natural historian.
 Pliny the Younger, nephew of the Elder
 Titus, Emperor of Rome
 Berenice of Cilicia, Titus' exiled Jewish mistress
 Domitian, Titus' younger brother
 Gaius Suetonius Tranquillus, the famous historian, who appears as a young man initially betrothed to Flavia.
 Gaius Valerius Flaccus, the poet, who appears in several novels as a teenaged man, and a love interest of Flavia's.
 Titus Flavius Josephus, famous Jewish historian.
 Julia Flavia, Titus' daughter.

Novels
 The Thieves of Ostia (2001)
 The Secrets of Vesuvius (2001)
 The Pirates of Pompeii (2002)
 The Assassins of Rome (2002)
 The Dolphins of Laurentum (2003)
 The Twelve Tasks of Flavia Gemina (2003)
 The Enemies of Jupiter (2003)
 The Gladiators from Capua (2004)
 The Colossus of Rhodes (novel)|The Colossus of Rhodes (2005)
 The Fugitive from Corinth (2005)
 The Sirens of Surrentum (2006)
 The Charioteer of Delphi (2006)
 The Slave-girl from Jerusalem (2007)
 The Beggar of Volubilis (2008)
 The Scribes from Alexandria (2008)
 The Prophet from Ephesus (2009)
 The Man from Pomegranate Street (2009)

Omnibus
The Roman Mysteries Omnibus I: The Thieves of Ostia, the Secrets of Vesuvius and the Pirates of Pompeii.
The Roman Mysteries Omnibus II: The Assassins of Rome, the Dolphins of Laurentum, the Twelve Tasks of Flavia Gemina.
The Roman Mysteries Omnibus III: The Enemies of Jupiter, the Gladiators from Capua, the Colossus of Rhodes.

Mini-mysteries
 Bread and Circuses (short story published in 2003 in The Mammoth Book of Roman Whodunits); re-published in a shorter version as a novella, titled The Code of Romulus for World Book Day in April 2007)
 Trimalchio's Feast and other mini-mysteries (2007)
 The Legionary from Londinium and other mini-mysteries (2010)

Companion books
 The First Roman Mysteries Quiz Book
 The Second Roman Mysteries Quiz Book
 The Roman Mysteries Treasury (2007)
 From Ostia to Alexandria with Flavia Gemina: Travels with Flavia Gemina (2008)

Sequel trilogy
In 2008 a sequel trilogy for young adults was proposed, with the main characters being Jonathan's 14-year-old orphaned twin nephews. The stories would have been partly set in Roman Britain. The first book was to be published in March 2010. The working title for the trilogy was the Flavian Trilogy, with individual stories "Brothers of Jackals", "Companion of Owls" and "Prey of Lions". On her blog and website, Caroline Lawrence has said the content was deemed "too edgy" for the Roman Mysteries brand and as a result has been put on hold indefinitely.

In April 2010, author Caroline Lawrence announced that she is planning a spinoff for younger readers. The main character will be Threptus, an 8-year-old Ostian beggar boy who makes appearances in the final Roman Mystery, The Man from Pomegranate Street and the final short story in The Legionary from Londinium and other mini-mysteries.

Special features
Each of the novels has at least one map of the area covered in the story, sometimes also plans or diagrams; these are by Richard Russell Lawrence. The chapters are called scrolls, after the rolls of papyrus which were Roman 'books', and are numbered with Roman numerals. The glossary explaining Roman terms is called "Aristo's Scroll", after Flavia's tutor, and the author's note, which separates fact from fiction, is called "The Last Scroll".

TV series

The BBC produced a television series based on the books, entitled Roman Mysteries. The first season was broadcast in 2007, the second season in 2008.

References

External links
Official Roman Mysteries website
Official BBC site for the TV series
TV Tropes The Roman Mysteries page

 
Lagardère SCA franchises
Novels set in ancient Rome
Cultural depictions of Domitian
Historical mystery novels
Cultural depictions of Titus